Guajiasi Subdistrict is a subdistrict situated on the northern portion of Hexi District, Tianjin, China. It is located in the south of Xiawafang Subdistrict, west of Fumin Road Subdistrict, north of Chentangzhuang and Jianshan Subdistricts, and east of Yuexiu Road Subdistrict. According to the 2020 census, its total population was 88,190.

The subdistrict was formed in 1954. Its name is referring to Guajia Chan Temple that is situated on the north of the subdistrict.

Administrative divisions 
As of the time in writing, Guajiasi Subdistrict consists of 13 communities. They are, by the order of their Administrative Division Codes:

References 

Township-level divisions of Tianjin
Hexi District, Tianjin